Ewo is a village in the Republic of the Congo that serves as the administrative center of Ewo District and the Cuvette-Ouest region. The village had a population 9,062 in 2012. It is served by Ewo Airport.

References

Cuvette-Ouest Department
Populated places in the Republic of the Congo